North Murchison (or Murchison North) was an electoral district of the Legislative Assembly in the Australian state of Western Australia from 1897 to 1904.

The district was located in the Western Australian outback. It existed for two terms of parliament, but had three members and staged two by-elections in that time. In 1898, its major settlement was the town of Nannine, and it included the Peak Hill goldfield and some pastoral leases such as Moorarie Station. Its first member was Henry Kenny, who died two years into his term in May 1899. The subsequent by-election saw Frederick Moorhead elected to fill the vacancy. Moorhead retained the seat at the 1901 state election but afterward resigned his seat after being appointed minister, as was the convention at the time. Moorhead was defeated in the ensuing by-election by Labor candidate John Holman. When the district was abolished ahead of the 1904 state election, Holman instead won election to the seat of Murchison.

Members for North Murchison

Election results

References

North Murchison
1897 establishments in Australia
Constituencies established in 1897
1904 disestablishments in Australia
Constituencies disestablished in 1904